Christian Rasp (born 29 September 1989) is a German bobsledder. He competed in the four-man event at the 2018 Winter Olympics.

References

External links

 

1989 births
Living people
German male bobsledders
Olympic bobsledders of Germany
Olympic medalists in bobsleigh
Olympic silver medalists for Germany
Bobsledders at the 2018 Winter Olympics
Bobsledders at the 2022 Winter Olympics
Medalists at the 2022 Winter Olympics
People from Ochsenfurt
Sportspeople from Lower Franconia
21st-century German people